Survivor: Millennials vs. Gen X is the 33rd season of the American CBS competitive reality television series Survivor. It featured two initial tribes of ten new castaways divided by generation: Gen X, born between 1963 and 1982, and Millennials, born between 1984 and 1997 (no one born in 1983 was cast this season). It is the third season to divide the castaways into tribes by age, following Survivor: Panama and  Survivor: Nicaragua, and the second season to film in Fiji, following Survivor: Fiji, which was filmed in a different location. The season premiered on September 21, 2016 with a 90-minute episode and ended on December 14, 2016 when Adam Klein was unanimously awarded the title of Sole Survivor over Ken McNickle and Hannah Shapiro by a jury vote of 10–0–0.

This season featured the first full cast evacuation, where all contestants were removed on the second day of competition due to Severe Tropical Cyclone Zena; the castaways were returned to their camps the next morning and no additional time was needed to complete the game.

Contestants
The cast is composed of 20 new players, initially split into two tribes containing ten members each: Takali ("Gen X") and Vanua ("Millennials"). The tribe names come from the Fijian words for "open ocean" and "homeland", respectively. On Day 13, the remaining castaways were redistributed into three tribes, including new tribe Ikabula, named after the Fijian word for "turtle". On Day 21, the remaining castaways were merged into one tribe, which they named Vinaka after the Fijian word for "thank you". Notable castaways this season include David Wright, a writer on the FOX animated sitcom Family Guy, and Smosh Games YouTuber Mari Takahashi.

Future appearances
Michaela Bradshaw and Zeke Smith returned the following season for Survivor: Game Changers. David Wright returned for Survivor: Edge of Extinction. Adam Klein returned to compete on Survivor: Winners at War.

Outside of Survivor, Bret LaBelle and Chris Hammons competed as a team in The Amazing Race 31. Michelle Schubert competed on the eleventh season of American Ninja Warrior. Jay Starrett appeared on the second season of the MTV reality series Ex on the Beach, the thirty-fifth, thirty-sixth, and thirty-eighth seasons of the MTV reality competition series The Challenge. Bradshaw competed on the thirty-seventh season of The Challenge.

Season summary
The 20 new castaways were initially divided into tribes based on generation. The Gen X tribe was fractured between two alliances—one led by Paul and Chris, and the other by David and Ken—while the Millennial tribe's majority was run by Jay and Michelle. With 16 players remaining, the castaways were divided into three tribes, during which Millennial outsiders Adam and Zeke worked with the Gen X-ers against the majority Millennial alliance.

The four initial alliances regrouped at the merge: the core Millennial alliance; the Millennial outsider alliance of Adam, Hannah and Zeke; Chris's alliance; and David and Ken's alliance. While the latter three alliances initially formed a majority coalition, it eventually splintered as David and Zeke targeted each other. Zeke rallied together the remnants of Chris's alliance and the core Millennial alliance, while Adam and Hannah joined David's alliance; David's alliance ultimately won out, and Adam, David, Hannah and Ken were able to eliminate all others, though Adam's attempts to betray David for being the largest strategic threat remaining were thwarted by Hannah and Ken's unwavering loyalty.

With only the four remaining, Hannah and Ken decided to join Adam to eliminate David. At the final Tribal Council, the jury lambasted Ken and Hannah for following David too long, while Adam was applauded for being loyal but also willing to eliminate threats, which led the jury to unanimously vote Adam as Sole Survivor.

Episodes

Voting history

Notes

Reception
This season received mainly positive reception by critics and fans alike, for the cast and their high level of gameplay, though the editing of the season received some criticism. Editor of Entertainment Weekly, Dalton Ross, ranked it as the 11th-best season of the series, praised the season as a whole stating that the finale was "yet another great piece of theater in what turned out to be a great season of Survivor. A season that remains great due to the crowning of a solid winner in Adam." He felt that "the season went from not bad to pretty good to legitimately great over the course of a few months," which he attributes to David's fake idol, calling it "the best fake immunity idol of all time" and "[how hard] the entire cast was playing." He praised the cast in particular and felt it was "an incredible season in general." Daniel Fienerg of The Hollywood Reporter initially had mixed feeling towards the season, calling it a "dud," but became much more positive towards the season later, stating that the season "had one of the strongest home stretches of any Survivor season in recent memory, if not any Survivor season ever." In 2020, "The Purple Rock Podcast" ranked Survivor: Millennials vs. Gen X as the 13th-best season in the series, stating that the season has "several enjoyable narrative arcs, some nice interactions between the players, and some of those delicious tears that Probst loves so much." Later in the year, Inside Survivor ranked the season 21st out of 40 writing that "'Millennials vs. Gen-X' is such a zeitgeisty gimmick that screams ‘desperate ploy for ratings.’ However, ludicrous theme aside, the season itself is highly enjoyable with an array of memorable characters, exciting gameplay, and one of the most emotional endings in the show's history." In 2021, Rob Has a Podcast ranked Millennials vs. Gen X 12th during the Survivor All-Time Top 40 Rankings podcast.

References

External links
 Official CBS Survivor website

2016 American television seasons
33
2016 in Fiji
Television shows filmed in Fiji
Television shows set in Fiji